Michal Desenský (born 1 March 1993) is a Czech sprinter specializing in the 400 metres. He represented his country in the 4 × 400 metres relay at the 2016 European Championships finishing fourth, at the 2018 World Indoor Championships finishing fifth, and at the 2019 European Games finishing second in the mixed 4 × 400 metres relay.

International competitions

Personal bests
Outdoor
200 metres – 21.19 (0.0 m/s, Prague 2020)
400 metres – 46.36 (Hodonín 2022)
Indoor
200 metres – 21.21 (Prague 2016)
400 metres – 46.36 (Ostrava 2020)

References

1993 births
Living people
Czech male sprinters
Athletes (track and field) at the 2019 European Games
European Games medalists in athletics
European Games silver medalists for the Czech Republic
Sportspeople from Hradec Králové
Athletes (track and field) at the 2020 Summer Olympics
Olympic athletes of the Czech Republic